Helianthus maximiliani is a North American species of sunflower known by the common name Maximilian sunflower.

This sunflower is named for Prince Maximilian of Wied-Neuwied, who encountered it on his travels in North America.

Helianthus maximiliani is native to the Great Plains in central North America, and naturalized in the eastern and western parts of the continent. It is now found from British Columbia to Maine, south to the Carolinas, Chihuahua, and California. The plant thrives in a number of ecosystems, particularly across the plains in central Canada and the United States. It is also cultivated as an ornamental.

Description
The slender, tall, erect stems and alternately-arranged leaves are covered in rough hairs.

The flower heads are surrounded at the base by pointed green phyllaries which often stick straight out and curl at the tips.

The plant reproduces by seed and by vegetative sprouting from the rhizome.

Uses
The thick rhizome is edible and provided a food similar to the Jerusalem artichoke for Native American groups such as the Sioux. The flower heads are attractive to insects and the fruits are eaten by birds. Livestock eat portions of the plant, and the seeds are eaten by various wildlife.

The Land Institute, a perennial agriculture research center located in Salina, Kansas, run by Wes Jackson is experimenting with this species to create a perennial oilseed grain crop that does not necessitate replanting each season.

References

External links
 Jepson Manual Treatment
 United States Department of Agriculture Plants Profile
 United States Department of Agriculture, National Forest Service Ecology
 United States Geologic Survey, Northern Prairie Wildflowers
 Lady Bird Johnson Wildflower Center, University of Texas, Photo gallery
 Land Institute
Photo of herbarium specimen at Missouri Botanical Garden, collected in Missouri in 1951, neotype for Helianthus maximiliani neotype designated in Heiser, C. B. 1966. The North American sunflowers (Helianthus). Mem. Torrey Bot. Club 22(3): 154(157).

maximiliani
Plants used in Native American cuisine
Plants described in 1835
Flora of North America